Summer Enrichment Program may refer to:
Summer Enrichment Program (University of Colorado)
Summer Enrichment Program (University of Virginia)